The Men's 1 metre springboard competition at the 2022 World Aquatics Championships was held on 30 June 2022.

Results
The preliminary round was started at 12:00. The final was held at 19:00.

Green denotes finalists

References

Men's 1 metre springboard